The Kingdom of Sardinia, also referred to as the Kingdom of Sardinia-Piedmont or Piedmont-Sardinia during the Savoyard period, was a state in Southern Europe from the early 14th until the mid-19th century.

Beginning in 1324, James and his successors conquered the island of Sardinia and established de facto their de jure authority. In 1420, after the Sardinian–Aragonese war, the last competing claim to the island was bought out. After the union of the crowns of Aragon and Castile, Sardinia became a part of the burgeoning Spanish Empire.

In 1720, the island was ceded by the Habsburg and Bourbon claimants to the Spanish throne to the Duke of Savoy, Victor Amadeus II. The Savoyards united it with their historical possessions on the Italian mainland, and the kingdom came to be progressively identified with the Mainland states, which included, besides Savoy and Aosta, dynastic possessions like the Principality of Piedmont and the County of Nice, over both of which the Savoyards had been exercising their control since the 13th century and 1388, respectively.

The formal name of this composite state was the "States of His Majesty the King of Sardinia", and it was and is referred to as either Sardinia-Piedmont, Piedmont-Sardinia, or erroneously the Kingdom of Piedmont, since the island of Sardinia had always been of secondary importance to the monarchy. Under Savoyard rule, the kingdom's government, ruling class, cultural models and center of population were entirely situated in the mainland. Therefore, while the capital of the island of Sardinia and the seat of its viceroys had always been de jure Cagliari, it was the Piedmontese city of Turin, the capital of Savoy since the mid 16th century, which was the de facto seat of power. This situation would be conferred official status with the Perfect Fusion of 1847, when all the kingdom's governmental institutions would be centralized in Turin.

When the mainland domains of the House of Savoy were occupied and eventually annexed by Napoleonic France, the king of Sardinia temporarily resided on the island for the first time in Sardinia's history under Savoyard rule. The Congress of Vienna (1814–15), which restructured Europe after Napoleon's defeat, returned to Savoy its mainland possessions and augmented them with Liguria, taken from the Republic of Genoa. Following Geneva’s accession to Switzerland, the Treaty of Turin (1816) transferred Carouge and adjacent areas to the newly-created Swiss Canton of Geneva. In 1847–48, through an act of Union analogous to the one between Great Britain and Ireland, the various Savoyard states were unified under one legal system with their capital in Turin, and granted a constitution, the Statuto Albertino.

By the time of the Crimean War in 1853, the Savoyards had built the kingdom into a strong power. There followed the annexation of Lombardy (1859), the central Italian states and the Two Sicilies (1860), Venetia (1866), and the Papal States (1870). On 17 March 1861, to more accurately reflect its new geographic, cultural and political extent, the Kingdom of Sardinia changed its name to the Kingdom of Italy, and its capital was eventually moved first to Florence and then to Rome. The Savoy-led Kingdom of Piedmont-Sardinia was thus the legal predecessor of the Kingdom of Italy, which in turn is the predecessor of the present-day Italian Republic.

Early history

In 238 BC Sardinia became, along with Corsica, a province of the Roman Empire. The Romans ruled the island until the middle of the 5th century when it was occupied by the Vandals, who had also settled in north Africa. In 534 AD it was reconquered by the Eastern Roman (Byzantine) Empire. It remained a Byzantine province until the Arab conquest of Sicily in the 9th century. After that, communications with Constantinople became very difficult, and powerful families of the island assumed control of the land.

Facing Arab attempts to sack and conquer, while having almost no outside help, Sardinia used the principle of translatio imperii ("transfer of rule") and continued to organize itself along the ancient Roman and Byzantine model. The island was not the personal property of the ruler and of his family, as was then the dominant practice in western Europe, but rather a separate entity and during the Byzantine Empire, a monarchical republic, as it had been since Roman times.

Starting from 705 to 706, Saracens from north Africa (recently conquered by Arab armies) harassed the population of the coastal cities. Information about the Sardinian political situation in the following centuries is scarce. Due to Saracen attacks, in the 9th century Tharros was abandoned in favor of Oristano, after more than 1800 years of occupation; Caralis, Porto Torres and numerous other coastal centres suffered the same fate. There is a record of another massive Saracen sea attack in 1015–16 from the Balearics, commanded by Mujāhid al-ʿĀmirī (Latinized as Museto). The Saracen attempt to invade the island was stopped by the Judicates with the support of the fleets of the maritime republics of Pisa and Genoa. Pope Benedict VIII also requested aid from the two maritime republics in the struggle against the Arabs.

After the Great Schism, Rome made many efforts to restore Latinity to the Sardinian church, politics and society, and to finally reunify the island under one Catholic ruler, as it had been for all of southern Italy, when the Byzantines had been driven away by Catholic Normans. Even the title of "Judge" was a Byzantine reminder of the Greek church and state, in times of harsh relations between eastern and western churches (Massacre of the Latins, 1182, Siege of Constantinople (1204), Recapture of Constantinople, 1261).

Before the Kingdom of Sardinia and Corsica, the Archons (ἄρχοντες) or, in Latin, judices, who reigned in the island from the 9th or 10th century until the beginning of the 11th century, can be considered real kings of all Sardinia (Κύριε βοήθε ιοῦ δού λού σου Tουρκοτουρίου ἅρχωντοσ Σαρδινίας καί τής δού ληςσου Γετιτ), even though nominal vassals of the Byzantine emperors. Of these sovereigns, only two names are known: Turcoturiu and Salusiu (Tουρκοτουριου βασιλικου προτοσπαθαριου  και Σαλουσιου των ευγενεστατων άρχωντων), who probably ruled in the 10th century. The Archons still wrote in Greek or Latin, but one of the oldest documents left of the Judicate of Cagliari (the so-called Carta Volgare), issued by Torchitorio I de Lacon-Gunale in 1070, was already written in the Romance Sardinian language, albeit with the Greek alphabet.

The realm was divided into four small kingdoms, the Judicates of Cagliari, Arborea, Gallura and Logudoro, perfectly organized as was the previous realm, but was now under the influence of the papacy, which claimed sovereignty over the entire island, and in particular of the Italian states of Genoa and Pisa, that through alliances with the "judges" (the local rulers), secured their political and economic zones of influence. While Genoa was mostly, but not always, in the north and west regions of Sardinia, that is, in the Judicates of Gallura and Logudoro; Pisa was mostly, but not always, in the south and east, in the Judicates of Cagliari and Arborea. That was the cause of conflicts leading to a long war between the Judges, who regarded themselves as kings fighting against rebellious nobles.

Later, the title of King of Sardinia was granted by the Emperor of the Holy Roman Empire to Barisone II of Arborea and Enzio of Sardinia. The first could not reunify the island under his rule, despite years of war against the other Sardinian judges, and he finally concluded a peace treaty with them in 1172. The second did not have the opportunity. Invested with the title from his father, Emperor Frederick II in 1239, he was soon recalled by his parent and appointed Imperial Vicar for Italy. He died in 1272 without direct recognized heirs after a detention of 23 years in a prison in Bologna.

The Kingdom of Sardinia and Corsica (later, just the "Kingdom of Sardinia" from 1460) was a state whose king was the King of Aragon, who started to conquer it in 1324, gained full control in 1410, and directly ruled it until 1460. In that year it was incorporated into a sort of confederation of states, each with its own institutions, called the Crown of Aragon, and united only in the person of the king. The Crown of Aragon was made by a council of representatives of the various states and grew in importance for the main purpose of separating the legacy of Ferdinand II of Aragon from that of Isabella I of Castile when they married in 1469.

The idea of the kingdom was created in 1297 by Pope Boniface VIII, as a hypothetical entity created for James II of Aragon under a secret clause in the Treaty of Anagni. This was an inducement to join in the effort to restore Sicily, then under the rule of James's brother Frederick III of Sicily, to the Angevin dynasty over the oppositions of the Sicilians. The two islands proposed for this new kingdom were occupied by other states and fiefs at the time. In Sardinia, three of the four states that had succeeded Byzantine imperial rule in the 9th century had passed through marriage and partition under the direct or indirect control of Pisa and Genoa in the 40 years preceding the Anagni treaty. Genoa had also ruled Corsica since conquering the island nearly two centuries before (c. 1133).

There were other reasons beside this papal decision: it was the final successful result of the long fight against the Ghibelline (pro-imperial) city of Pisa and the Holy Roman Empire itself. Furthermore, Sardinia was then under the control of the very Catholic kings of Aragon, and the last result of rapprochement of the island to Rome. The Sardinian church had never been under the control of the Ecumenical Patriarchate of Constantinople; it was an autonomous province loyal to Rome and belonging to the Latin Church, but during the Byzantine period became influenced by Byzantine liturgy and culture.

Foundation of the Kingdom of Sardinia

In 1297, Pope Boniface VIII, intervening between the Houses of Anjou and Aragon, established on paper a Regnum Sardiniae et Corsicae that would be a fief of the papacy. Then, ignoring the indigenous states which already existed, the pope offered his newly invented fief to James II of Aragon, promising him papal support should he wish to conquer Pisan Sardinia in exchange for Sicily.
In 1323 James II formed an alliance with Hugh II of Arborea and, following a military campaign which lasted a year or so, occupied the Pisan territories of Cagliari and Gallura along with the city of Sassari, claiming the territory as the Kingdom of Sardinia and Corsica.

In 1353, Arborea waged war on Aragon. The Crown of Aragon did not reduce the last of the judicates (indigenous kingdoms of Sardinia) until 1420.
The Kingdom of Sardinia and Corsica retained its separate character as part of the Crown of Aragon and was not merely incorporated into the Kingdom of Aragon. At the time of his struggles with Arborea, Peter IV of Aragon granted an autonomous legislature to the kingdom and its legal traditions. The kingdom was governed in the king's name by a viceroy.

In 1420, Alfonso V of Aragon, king of Sicily and heir to Aragon, bought the remaining territories for 100,000 gold florins of the Judicate of Arborea in the 1420 from the last judge, William III of Narbonne, and the "Kingdom of Sardinia" extended throughout the island, except for the city of Castelsardo (at that time called Casteldoria or Castelgenovese) that was stolen from the Doria in 1448, and renamed Castillo Aragonés (Aragonese Castle).

Corsica, which had never been conquered, was dropped from the formal title and Sardinia passed with the Crown of Aragon to a united Spain. The defeat of the local kingdoms, communes and signorie, the firm Aragonese (later Spanish) rule, the introduction of a sterile feudalism, as well as the discovery of the Americas, provoked an unstoppable decline of the Kingdom of Sardinia. A short period of uprisings occurred under the local noble Leonardo Alagon, marquess of Oristano, who defended his territories against Viceroy Nicolò Carroz and managed to defeat the viceroy's army in the 1470s, but was later crushed at the Battle of Macomer in 1478, ending any further revolts in the island. The unceasing attacks from north African pirates and a series of plagues (in 1582, 1652 and 1655) further worsened the situation.

Aragonese conquest of Sardinia

Although the "Kingdom of Sardinia and Corsica" could be said to have started as a questionable and extraordinary de jure state in 1297, its de facto existence began in 1324 when, called by their allies of the Judicate of Arborea in the course of war with the Republic of Pisa, James II seized the Pisan territories in the former states of Cagliari and Gallura and asserted his papally-approved title. In 1347; Aragon made war on landlords of the Doria House and the Malaspina House, who were citizens of the Republic of Genoa, which controlled most of the lands of the former Logudoro state in north-western Sardinia, including the city of Alghero and the semiautonomous Republic of Sassari, and added them to its direct domains.

The Judicate of Arborea, the only Sardinian state that remained independent of foreign domination, proved far more difficult to subdue. Threatened by the Aragonese claims of suzerainty and consolidation of the rest of the island, in 1353 Arborea, under the leadership of Marianus IV, started the conquest of the remaining Sardinian territories, which formed the Kingdom of Sardinia. In 1368 an Arborean offensive succeeded in nearly driving the Aragonese from the island, reducing the "Kingdom of Sardinia and Corsica" to just the port cities of Cagliari and Alghero and incorporating everything else into their own kingdom.

A peace treaty returned the Aragonese their previous possessions in 1388, but tensions continued and, in 1382, the Arborean army led by Brancaleone Doria again swept the most of the island into Arborean rule. This situation lasted until 1409 when the army of the Judicate of Arborea suffered a heavy defeat by the Aragonese army in the Battle of Sanluri. After the sale of the remaining territories for 100,000 gold florins to the Judicate of Arborea in 1420, the "Kingdom of Sardinia" extended throughout the island, except for the city of Castelsardo (at that time called Casteldoria or Castelgenovese), which had been stolen from the Doria in 1448. The subduing of Sardinia having taken a century, Corsica, which had never been wrestled from the Genoese, was dropped from the formal title of the kingdom.

Early history of Savoy

During the 3rd century BC, the Allobroges settled down in the region between the Rhône and the Alps. This region, named Allobrigia and later "Sapaudia" in Latin, was integrated to the Roman Empire. In the 5th century, the region of Savoy was ceded by the Western Roman Empire to the Burgundians and became part of the Kingdom of Burgundy.

Piedmont was inhabited in early historic times by Celto-Ligurian tribes such as the Taurini and the Salassi. They later submitted to the Romans (c. 220 BC), who founded several colonies there including Augusta Taurinorum (Turin) and Eporedia (Ivrea). After the fall of the Western Roman Empire, the region was repeatedly invaded by the Burgundians, the Goths (5th century), Byzantines, Lombards (6th century), and the Franks (773). At the time Piedmont, as part of the Kingdom of Italy within the Holy Roman Empire, was subdivided into several marks and counties.

In 1046, Oddo of Savoy added Piedmont to their main segment of Savoy, with a capital at Chambéry (now in France). Other areas remained independent, such as the powerful communes of Asti and Alessandria, and the marquisates of Saluzzo and Montferrat. The County of Savoy was elevated to a duchy in 1416, and Duke Emmanuel Philibert moved the seat to Turin in 1563.

Exchange of Sardinia for Sicily

The Spanish domination of Sardinia ended at the beginning of the 18th century, as a result of the War of the Spanish succession. By the Treaty of Utrecht of 1713, Spain's European empire was divided: Savoy received Sicily and parts of the Duchy of Milan, while Charles VI (the Holy Roman Emperor and Archduke of Austria), received the Spanish Netherlands, the Kingdom of Naples, Sardinia, and the bulk of the Duchy of Milan.

During the War of the Quadruple Alliance, Victor Amadeus II, Duke of Savoy and Prince of Piedmont (and now King of Sicily too), had to agree to yield Sicily to the Austrian Habsburgs and receive Sardinia in exchange. The exchange was formally ratified in the Treaty of The Hague of 17 February 1720. Because the Kingdom of Sardinia had existed since the 14th century, the exchange allowed Victor Amadeus to retain the title of king in spite of the loss of Sicily.

Victor Amadeus initially resisted the exchange, and until 1723 continued to style himself King of Sicily rather than King of Sardinia. The state took the official title of Kingdom of Sardinia, Cyprus and Jerusalem, as the house of Savoy still claimed the thrones of Cyprus and Jerusalem, although both had long been under Ottoman rule.

In 1767–1769, Charles Emmanuel III annexed the Maddalena archipelago in the Strait of Bonifacio from the Republic of Genoa and claimed it as part of Corsica. Since then the archipelago has been a part of the Sardinian region.

Napoleonic Wars and the Congress of Vienna
In 1792, the Kingdom of Sardinia and the other states of the Savoy Crown joined the First Coalition against the French First Republic, but was beaten in 1796 by Napoleon and forced to conclude the disadvantageous Treaty of Paris (1796), giving the French army free passage through Piedmont. On 6 December 1798 Joubert occupied Turin and forced Charles Emmanuel IV to abdicate and leave for the island of Sardinia. The provisionary government voted to unite Piedmont with France. In 1799 the Austro-Russians briefly occupied the city, but with the Battle of Marengo (1800), the French regained control. The island of Sardinia stayed out of the reach of the French for the rest of the war.

In 1814, the Crown of Savoy enlarged its territories with the addition of the former Republic of Genoa, now a duchy, and it served as a buffer state against France. This was confirmed by the Congress of Vienna, which returned the region of Savoy to its borders after it had been annexed by France in 1792. By the Treaty of Stupinigi, the Kingdom of Sardinia extended its protectorate over the Principality of Monaco.

In the reaction after Napoleon, the country was ruled by conservative monarchs: Victor Emmanuel I (1802–21), Charles Felix (1821–31) and Charles Albert (1831–49), who fought at the head of a contingent of his own troops at the Battle of Trocadero, which set the reactionary Ferdinand VII on the Spanish throne. Victor Emanuel I disbanded the entire Code Napoléon and returned the lands and power to the nobility and the Church. This reactionary policy went as far as discouraging the use of roads built by the French. These changes typified Sardinia.

The Kingdom of Sardinia industrialized from 1830 onward. A constitution, the Statuto Albertino, was enacted in the year of revolutions, 1848 under liberal pressure. In the same year the island of Sardinia, a Piedmontese dependency for more than a century, lost its own residual autonomy to the mainland through the so-called Perfect fusion issued by Charles Albert; as a result, the kingdom's fundamental institutions were deeply transformed, assuming the shape of a constitutional and centralized monarchy on the French model; under the same pressure, Charles Albert declared war on Austria. After initial success, the war took a turn for the worse and Charles Albert was defeated by Marshal Radetzky at the Battle of Custozza (1848).

Savoyard struggle for the Italian unification

Like all the various duchies and city-states on the Apennine peninsula and associated islands, the Kingdom of Sardinia was troubled with political instability under alternating governments. After a short and disastrous renewal of the war with Austria in 1849, Charles Albert abdicated on 23 March 1849 in favour of his son Victor Emmanuel II.

In 1852, a liberal ministry under Count Camillo Benso di Cavour was installed and the Kingdom of Sardinia became the engine driving Italian unification. The Kingdom of Sardinia took part in the Crimean War, allied with the Ottoman Empire, Britain, and France, and fighting against Russia.

In 1859, France sided with the Kingdom of Sardinia in a war against Austria, the Austro-Sardinian War. Napoleon III did not keep his promises to Cavour to fight until all of the Kingdom of Lombardy–Venetia had been conquered. Following the bloody battles of Magenta and Solferino, both French victories, Napoleon thought the war too costly to continue and made a separate peace behind Cavour's back in which only Lombardy would be ceded.

Due to the Austrian government's refusal to cede any lands to the Kingdom of Sardinia, they agreed to cede Lombardy to Napoleon, who in turn then ceded the territory to the Kingdom of Sardinia to avoid "embarrassing" the defeated Austrians. Cavour angrily resigned from office when it became clear that Victor Emmanuel would accept this arrangement.

Garibaldi and the Thousand
On 5 March 1860, Piacenza, Parma, Tuscany, Modena, and Romagna voted in referendums to join the Kingdom of Sardinia. This alarmed Napoleon III, who feared a strong Savoyard state on his south-eastern border and he insisted that if the Kingdom of Sardinia were to keep the new acquisitions they would have to cede Savoy and Nice to France. This was done through the Treaty of Turin, which also called for referendums to confirm the annexation. Subsequently, somewhat controversial referendums showed over 99.5% majorities in both areas in favour of joining France.

In 1860, Giuseppe Garibaldi started his campaign to conquer the southern Apennines in the name of the Kingdom of Sardinia. He quickly toppled the Kingdom of the Two Sicilies, which was the largest of the states in the region, stretching from Abruzzo and Naples on the mainland to Messina and Palermo on Sicily. He then marched to Gaeta in the central peninsula. Cavour was satisfied with the unification, while Garibaldi, who was too revolutionary for the king and his prime minister, wanted to conquer Rome as well.

Garibaldi was disappointed in this development, as well as in the loss of his home province, Nice, to France. He also failed to fulfill the promises that had gained him popular and military support by the Sicilians: that the new nation would be a republic, not a kingdom, and that the Sicilians would see great economic gains after unification. The former did not come to pass until 1946.

Towards the Kingdom of Italy
On 17 March 1861, law no. 4671 of the Sardinian Parliament proclaimed the Kingdom of Italy, so ratifying the annexations of all other Apennine states, plus Sicily, to the Kingdom of Sardinia. The institutions and laws of the kingdom were quickly extended to all of Italy, abolishing the administrations of the other regions. Piedmont became the most dominant and wealthiest region in Italy and the capital of Piedmont, Turin, remained the Italian capital until 1865, when the capital was moved to Florence. But many revolts exploded throughout the peninsula, especially in southern Italy, and on the island of Sicily, because of the perceived unfair treatment of the south by the Piedmontese ruling class. The House of Savoy ruled Italy until 1946, when Italy was declared a republic by referendum. The result was 54.3% in favor of the Republic.

Currency
The currency in use in Savoy was the Piedmontese scudo. During the Napoleonic era, it was replaced in general circulation by the French franc. In 1816, after regaining their mainland domains, the scudo was replaced by the Sardinian lira, which in 1821 also replaced the Sardinian scudo, the coins that had been in use on the island throughout the period.

Flags, royal standards and coats of arms

When the Duchy of Savoy acquired the Kingdom of Sicily in 1713 and the Kingdom of Sardinia in 1723, the flag of Savoy became the flag of a naval power. This posed the problem that the same flag was already in use by the Knights of Malta. Because of this, the Savoyards modified their flag for use as a naval ensign in various ways, adding the letters FERT in the four cantons, or adding a blue border, or using a blue flag with the Savoy cross in one canton.

Eventually, King Charles Albert of Savoy adopted the "revolutionary" Italian tricolor, surmounted by the Savoyard shield, as his flag. This flag would later become the flag of the Kingdom of Italy, and the tricolor without the Savoyard escutcheon remains the flag of Italy.

References:

Maps

Territorial evolution of Sardinia from 1324 to 1720

Territorial evolution of Italy from 1796 to 1860

See also

 List of monarchs of Sardinia
 List of viceroys of Sardinia
 Spanish Empire
 S'hymnu sardu nationale
 Kingdom of Sardinia (1700–1720)

Notes and references

Footnotes

Notes

Bibliography
 Antonicelli, Aldo. "From Galleys to Square Riggers: The modernization of the navy of the Kingdom of Sardinia." The Mariner's Mirror 102.2 (2016): 153–173 online.
 
 Luttwak Edward, The Grand Strategy of the Byzantine Empire, The Belknap Press, 2009, 
 
 
 Romani, Roberto. "The Reason of the Elites: Constitutional Moderatism in the Kingdom of Sardinia, 1849–1861." in Sensibilities of the Risorgimento (Brill, 2018) pp. 192–244.
 Romani, Roberto. "Reluctant Revolutionaries: Moderate Liberalism in the Kingdom of Sardinia, 1849–1859." Historical Journal (2012): 45–73. online
 Schena, Olivetta. "The role played by towns in parliamentary commissions in the kingdom of Sardinia in the fifteenth and sixteenth centuries." Parliaments, Estates and Representation 39.3 (2019): 304–315.
 Smith, Denis Mack. Victor Emanuel, Cavour and the Risorgimento (Oxford UP, 1971) online.
 
  old interpretations but useful on details; vol 1 goes to 1859]; volume 2 online covers 1859–62

In Italian
 AAVV. (a cura di F. Manconi), La società sarda in età spagnola, Cagliari, Consiglio Regionale della Sardegna, 2 voll., 1992-3
 Blasco Ferrer Eduardo, Crestomazia Sarda dei primi secoli, collana Officina Linguistica, Ilisso, Nuoro, 2003, 
 Boscolo Alberto, La Sardegna bizantina e alto giudicale, Edizioni Della TorreCagliari 1978
 Casula Francesco Cesare, La storia di Sardegna, Carlo Delfino Editore, Sassari, 1994, 
 Coroneo Roberto, Arte in Sardegna dal IV alla metà dell'XI secolo, edizioni AV, Cagliari, 2011
 Coroneo Roberto, Scultura mediobizantina in Sardegna, Nuoro, Poliedro, 2000,
 Gallinari Luciano, Il Giudicato di Cagliari tra XI e XIII secolo. Proposte di interpretazioni istituzionali, in Rivista dell'Istituto di Storia dell'Europa Mediterranea, n°5, 2010
 Manconi Francesco, La Sardegna al tempo degli Asburgo, Il Maestrale, Nuoro, 2010, 
 Manconi Francesco, Una piccola provincia di un grande impero, CUEC, Cagliari, 2012, 
 Mastino Attilio, Storia della Sardegna Antica, Il Maestrale, Nuoro, 2005, 
 Meloni Piero, La Sardegna Romana, Chiarella, Sassari, 1980
 Motzo Bachisio Raimondo, Studi sui bizantini in Sardegna e sull'agiografia sarda, Deputazione di Storia Patria della Sardegna, Cagliari, 1987
 Ortu Gian Giacomo, La Sardegna dei Giudici, Il Maestrale, Nuoro, 2005, 
 Paulis Giulio, Lingua e cultura nella Sardegna bizantina: testimonianze linguistiche dell'influsso greco, Sassari, L'Asfodelo, 1983
 Spanu Luigi, Cagliari nel seicento, Edizioni Castello, Cagliari, 1999
 Zedda Corrado – Pinna Raimondo, La nascita dei Giudicati. Proposta per lo scioglimento di un enigma storiografico, in Archivio Storico Giuridico di Sassari, seconda serie, n° 12, 2007

 
Former countries in Europe

Viceroyalties of the Spanish Empire
1324 establishments in Europe
1861 disestablishments in Italy
States and territories established in 1324
States and territories disestablished in 1861
History of Sardinia
Former countries
Former monarchies of Europe
Island countries
Sardinia